Nelson George Greene  (September 20, 1899 in Philadelphia – May 6, 1983 in Lebanon, Pennsylvania) was a pitcher in Major League Baseball. He pitched in fifteen games for the Brooklyn Robins during the 1924 & 1925 seasons. He attended college at Lehigh University and Villanova University.

External links

1899 births
1983 deaths
Lehigh Mountain Hawks baseball players
Villanova Wildcats baseball players
Baseball players from Pennsylvania
Major League Baseball pitchers
Brooklyn Robins players
Richmond Colts players
Minneapolis Millers (baseball) players
Des Moines Demons players
Reading Keystones players
Hartford Senators players